Incyclinide (proposed trade name Metastat) is a chemically modified tetracycline antibiotic that was investigated in clinical trials for the treatment of rosacea, various tumours, allergic and inflammatory diseases and a number of other conditions.

Data from animal studies suggest that centrally infused incyclinide attenuates microglial mediated neuroinflammation in the paraventricular nucleus of the hypothalamus and sympathetic activation in angiotensin II-induced hypertension. This was also associated with unique changes in gut microbial communities and profound attenuation of gut pathology in animal models of hypertension.

Mechanism of action 
Like other tetracyclines, incyclinide inhibits matrix metalloproteinases. In contrast to traditional tetracyclines, it lacks antibiotic properties.

References 

Tetracycline antibiotics